James Royce may refer to:

James Royce (composer)
James Royce (Designated Survivor), fictional character

See also
William James Royce, writer